Shot in the Dark is the second studio album by American rock band Great White, released in 1986. It was originally released by Telegraph Records and distributed by Greenworld Entertainment. Later that same year it was picked up and re-issued by Capitol Records. The original issue featured a different intro to "She Shakes Me" (which was titled "Shake Me"), a different recording entirely of the song "Run Away", and a different mix of the several tracks. Great White's music in this album shows the transition from the pure heavy metal of the first album to a more blues-influenced style of heavy metal, paying homage to the great rock bands of the 1970s, like Led Zeppelin and AC/DC. This was the first album to feature drummer Audie Desbrow.

The album features one of the band's first well-known hits, a cover of The Angels song "Face the Day", as well as a cover of The Spencer Davis Group song "Gimme Some Lovin'"

The re-mastered CD release was on the Razor & Tie label and was remastered by Steve Hoffman.

Track listing 
Side one
"She Shakes Me" (Mark Kendall, Jack Russell, Alan Niven) – 3:25
"What Do You Do" (Michael Lardie, Russell, Kendall) – 4:13
"Face the Day" (John Brewster, Bernard "Doc" Neeson, Rick Brewster) – 5:21 (The Angels cover)
"Gimme Some Lovin'" (Steve Winwood, Spencer Davis, Mervyn "Muff" Winwood) – 3:52 (The Spencer Davis Group cover)

Side two
"Shot in the Dark" (Kendall, Niven) – 4:52
"Is Anybody There" (Russell, Jerry Lynn Williams) – 4:57
"Run Away" (Williams, Niven) – 4:18
"Waiting for Love" (Williams, Kendall, Niven) – 4:19

Japanese CD edition bonus track
"Red House" (Jimi Hendrix) – 8:46

Personnel

Great White 
Jack Russell – lead vocals
Mark Kendall – lead and rhythm guitar, backing vocals
Lorne Black – bass
Audie Desbrow – drums

Additional musicians 
Michael Lardie – keyboards, backing vocals, engineer
Jim Lang – keyboards
Tyana Parr, Donald Ducksworth – backing vocals

Production 
Wyn Davis – producer, engineer
Alan Niven – producer on "Face the Day"
Eddie Schreyer – mastering

Charts

References 

1986 albums
Capitol Records albums
Great White albums